Latvia First (LPV) is a right-wing populist political party in Latvia.

It was founded in August 2021 by businessman and former member of parliament, former Minister of Transport, former vice-mayor of Riga, Ainārs Šlesers. The party board chair is Ainārs Šlesers. The prequel to the party, the organisation Latvia First, was first registered on 1 July 2021, before the party itself was established at a founding congress on 14 August in Riga. The party is registered by the Latvian Register of Enterprises on 10 September 2021.

History 
In June 2021, businessman, the former Minister of Transport and Minister of Economy, former member of parliament, former vice-mayor of Riga, Ainārs Šlesers announced that he would run in the 2022 parliamentary elections for a new party that he himself would start. On 1 July, he founded the organisation Latvia – First.

The founding party congress was held in Riga on 14 August 2021. Jūlija Stepaņenko was elected to chair the party board, as well as to be the party's candidate for the role of President of Latvia. Ainārs Šlesers became the party's candidate for the Prime Minister's seat, and former MP Linda Liepiņa was chosen as the party's candidate for Speaker of the Saeima.

Right after the founding party congress, LPV announced its support for the 18 August protest against 'compulsory' vaccination organized by the Law and Order party. The protest was announced in response to the government bill that would make vaccination against COVID-19 mandatory for those working in healthcare, social-care, and education sectors and give employers the right to fire unvaccinated people. An hour before the start of the protest, LPV organized an election rally near the Freedom Monument, the crowd of several hundred party supporters then headed to the Riga Castle, where the main event took place.

The party subsequently organized two more protests against 'mandatory' vaccination on 18 September and 2 October. During the September protest, the party leaders unveiled an ultimatum to the President of Latvia Egils Levits, asking him to stop restricting people's freedoms, save 'voluntary' vaccination, and change the government. Levits was given two weeks to satisfy the demands, and, if not, the party promised to recall the President. Even though none of the demands were met after two weeks, no initiative on recalling Levits has been announced, instead, on 2 October, the party organized another protest near the Freedom Monument.

The party temporarily had two deputies in the Saeima – Jūlija Stepaņenko and Ļubova Švecova. Both were elected from the list of the Social Democratic Party "Harmony" in the 2018 Saeima elections. During Russia's invasion of Ukraine on March 4, 2022, both were expelled from the party, because Stepaņenko, the party's chairman of the board, protested the party's extended board meeting to discuss the party's attitude to the war in Ukraine and its consequences in Latvia. On March 3, Švecova did not vote in the Saeima to grant Ukraine the status of a candidate country for the European Union.

Members of the Honor to serve Riga party are running as candidates on the party ticket for the 2022 election.

Election results

Legislative elections

References

External links 
 Official website (in Latvian and Russian)
Facebook page (in Latvian)
Facebook page (in Russian)

Political parties established in 2021
Eurosceptic parties in Latvia
Conservative parties in Latvia
Nationalist parties in Latvia
2021 establishments in Latvia